Luda Kroitor is a salsa dancer from Australia. She is a five time world Salsa champion. She also won Australia's Dancing with the Stars twice.

Early life 
Kroitor was born in Moldova. She moved to Australia at ten years old. At ten years old, she partnered with dancer Oliver Pineda.

Career 
Kroitor is the former five time world Salsa champion with dance partner Oliver Pineda. She is known for her role as dance instructor on Dancing with the Stars. She rose to fame after winning Dancing with the Stars series 8, with her partner Luke Jacobz, who was an actor on Home and Away and McLeod's Daughters. She also won while partnered with singer Johnny Ruffo, in series 12.

Kroitor also choreographed for Australia's So You Think You Can Dance.

Personal life 
In 2012, Kroitor became engaged to Matt Wilson. The couple had a daughter together in 2014.

See also
 Emanuel School, Australia

References

Australian ballroom dancers
Dancing with the Stars (Australian TV series) winners
Living people
Australian female dancers
Salsa dancers
Year of birth missing (living people)